The Glass City Marathon is a marathon located in Toledo, Ohio. The race is typically held in April.

The race was established in 1971, starting and ending at the University of Toledo.

This race is a USATF certified course and an official qualifier for the Boston Marathon.

The race typically draws more than 1,000 competitors for the marathon race alone. Other events include the half-marathon and 5K.

List of winners of the Glass City Marathon

Men's

Women's

See also

 List of marathon races in North America

References

External links
 

Marathons in the United States
Annual sporting events in the United States
April sporting events
Recurring sporting events established in 1971
1971 establishments in Ohio
Toledo, Ohio